Narada Michael Walden (Michael Walden; born April 23, 1952) is an American musician, singer, songwriter and record producer. He acquired the nickname Narada from Sri Chinmoy.

He began his career as a drummer, working primarily in the jazz fusion realm, appearing with John McLaughlin and the Mahavishnu Orchestra, Chick Corea, Jaco Pastorius, Wayne Shorter and Weather Report, and Allan Holdsworth.  After being mentored by Quincy Jones, he transitioned into a role as a songwriter and producer, working in the 1980s and 1990s with numerous R & B acts such as Whitney Houston, Aretha Franklin, Mariah Carey, as well as other singers across a number of genres.  In 2020, he became the drummer for Journey, replacing Steve Smith. In 2021, he became one of two drummers in the band alongside the returning Deen Castronovo prior to leaving in 2022. He appears on the band's album Freedom (2022), having co-produced and played on the album before his departure.

Biography

Walden was born in Plainwell, Michigan. He attended Western Michigan University in Kalamazoo, Michigan, from 1970 to 1972.

Walden played with rock bands in Miami, Florida, after he graduated from college. He was a member of the 'second incarnation' of the Mahavishnu Orchestra from 1974 to 1976, playing drums and providing vocals. Atlantic released his first album, Garden of Love Light, in 1977 with a single that reached the R&B chart. This was followed by I Cry I Smile and The Awakening. The latter album reached No. 15 on the R&B chart. His singles continued to be popular in R&B during the 1980s. These included a duet with Patti Austin and an appearance on the soundtrack for the movie Bright Lights, Big City.

He built his studio in 1985 and produced music for The Temptations, Stacy Lattisaw, Aretha Franklin, Angela Bofill, Lisa Fischer, Sister Sledge, Herbie Hancock, Patti Austin, Whitney Houston, Clarence Clemons, George Benson, Sheena Easton, Kenny G, Lionel Richie, Al Jarreau, and Mariah Carey.

Walden has been nominated for eight Grammy Awards, winning three: Best R&B Song for "Freeway of Love" (1985); Producer of the Year, Non-Classical (1987); and Album of the Year for The Bodyguard: Original Soundtrack Album (1993).

Personal life
In 2013, Walden married former Catholic school teacher, Katie Mersereau, at Marin Civic Center, St Rafael, California, United States. The couple have two daughters, Kelly and Kayla and a son, Michael. The pair worked together on Walden's album Evolution, released in 2015, with Katie credited as providing backing vocals on four tracks and writing one song, under her married name, Katie Mersereau-Walden.

Discography

Albums

Singles

Soundtracks
 Perfect (1985)
 9½ Weeks (1986)
 Innerspace (1987)
 Mannequin (1987)
 Bright Lights, Big City (1988)
 Licence to Kill (1989)
 The Bodyguard (1992)
 Free Willy (1993)
 Crooklyn (1994)
 Jason's Lyric (1994)
 The Associate (1996)
 Now and Again (1999-2000)

Other collaborations

As drummer
 Mahavishnu Orchestra – Apocalypse (1974), Visions of the Emerald Beyond (1975), Inner Worlds (1976)
 Tommy Bolin – "Marching Powder" on Teaser (1975)
 Chick Corea – My Spanish Heart (1976)
 Jeff Beck – Wired (1976)
 Alphonso Johnson – Moonshadows (1976)
 Nova – Vimana (1976)
 Allan Holdsworth – Velvet Darkness (1976)
 Jaco Pastorius – "Come On, Come Over" on Jaco Pastorius (1976)
 Weather Report – "Black Market" and "Cannon Ball" on Black Market (1976)
 James Mason – Rhythm of Life (1977)
 John McLaughlin – Johnny McLaughlin: Electric Guitarist (1978)
 Robert Fripp – "Breathless", "NY3", "I've Had Enough of You" on Exposure (1979)
 Carlos Santana – Oneness: Silver Dreams – Golden Reality (1979)
 Zucchero Fornaciari - Rispetto (1986)
 Journey – Freedom (2022)

As producer
 Stacy Lattisaw – Let Me Be Your Angel (1980), "Jump to the Beat" (1980), With You (1981), Sneakin' Out (1982), Sixteen (1983) and Perfect Combination (1984)
 Sister Sledge – All American Girls (1981)
 Carl Carlton – "The Bad CC" (1982)
 Angela Bofill – "Too Tough" (1983), "Tonight I Give In" (1983), "I'm on Your Side" (1983)
 Clarence Clemons – Hero (1985)
 Aretha Franklin – Who's Zoomin' Who? (1985), Aretha (1986), Through the Storm (1989), "Everyday People" (1991), A Rose Is Still a Rose (1998)
 Whitney Houston – "How Will I Know" (1985), Whitney (1987), "One Moment in Time" (1988), I'm Your Baby Tonight (1990), "I'm Every Woman" (1992)
 George Benson – "Kisses in the Moonlight" and "While the City Sleeps" from While the City Sleeps... (1986)
 Sheena Easton – "So Far, So Good" (1986) from About Last Night and No Sound But a Heart and "Till Death Do Us Part" from My Cherie (1995)
 Luba – "How Many" (1986)
 Jermaine Stewart – "We Don't Have to Take Our Clothes Off" (1986)
 Pointer Sisters – "Be There" (1987)
 Starship – "Nothing's Gonna Stop Us Now" (1987)
 Yōko Oginome – Verge of Love (1988)
 Regina Belle – "Baby Come to Me" (1989)
 Natalie Cole – "I Do" (1989)
 Gladys Knight – "Licence to Kill" (1989)
 Patti LaBelle – "Still in Love" (1989)
 Eddie Murphy – "Put Your Mouth on Me" and "Till the Money's Gone" from So Happy (1989)
 Pia Zadora – "Pia Z" (1989)
 Mariah Carey – "Vision of Love" (1990), "I Don't Wanna Cry" (1991)
 Tevin Campbell – "Tell Me What You Want Me to Do" (1991)
 Lisa Fischer – "How Can I Ease the Pain" (1991)
 Shanice Wilson – "I Love Your Smile" and "I Hate to Be Lonely" from Inner Child (1991)
 Al Jarreau – Heaven and Earth (1992)
 Milira – "One Man Woman" (1992)
 Elton John & Kiki Dee – "True Love" (1993)
 Mica Paris – "Whisper a Prayer" (1993)
 Michelle Gayle – "Sweetness", "Freedom", "Happy Just to Be with You", "Baby Don't Go", "All Night Long" from the self titled album Michelle Gayle (1994)
 Al Green – "Your Heart's in Good Hands" (1995)
 Diana Ross – Take Me Higher (1995)
 Taral Hicks – "Whoopty Whoop", "Don't Let the Feelin' Go Away", "I Wish You Were Here" from This Time (1997)
 Steve Winwood – Junction Seven (1997)
 Don Novello as Father Guido Sarducci – "Everybody's Free to Wear Camouflage" (1999)
 Shanice Wilson – "Love Is the Gift" (2000)
 The Temptations – Awesome (2001)
 Ray Charles – Genius & Friends (2005)
 LaToya London – "Every Part of Me", "Learn to Breathe" and "State of My Heart" from Love & Life (2005)
 Brian Evans – "At Fenway" (2011)
 Sydney Brown – "Love Is Stronger than Smoke and Fire" (2018)
 Santana – "Whiter Shade of Pale", "Song for Cindy" (2021)
 Journey – Freedom (2022)
 Ukrainian smooth jazz singer  Shaxa (Shakhsanem Abraham) - “Never been higher”. https://on.soundcloud.com/iF5FVH4NTzTNeVUb8

References

External links
 
 
 Narada Walden Interview NAMM Oral History Library (1986)

1952 births
Living people
People from Kalamazoo, Michigan
Musicians from Michigan
African-American drummers
American dance musicians
American multi-instrumentalists
Record producers from Michigan
Grammy Award winners
Devotees of Sri Chinmoy
Reprise Records artists
Weather Report members
Mahavishnu Orchestra members
20th-century American drummers
American male drummers
American rock drummers
Rhythm and blues drummers
Soul drummers
21st-century American drummers
Journey (band) members